Talkhuncheh (also Romanized as Ţālkhvoncheh and Ţālkhūncheh) is a city in the Central District of Mobarakeh County, Isfahan Province, Iran.  At the 2006 census, its population was 9,307 in 2,536 families.

References

Populated places in Mobarakeh County

Cities in Isfahan Province